Terry Rodgers (born September 11, 1947) is an American artist known for his large scale canvases that focus on portraying contemporary body politics. He was born in Newark, New Jersey and raised in Washington, D.C., He graduated cum laude from Amherst College in Massachusetts in 1969, with a major in Fine Arts. His strong interest in film and photography influenced his style in the direction of representational realism in art.

In 2005, three of his monumental figurative canvases were presented at the Valencia Biennial. Abroad he has had solo exhibitions in galleries in Brussels, Amsterdam, Zurich and Milan, and participated in group shows around the world. In the United States, he has had solo gallery exhibitions in New York City, Los Angeles, Atlanta, and Chicago.

He has also exhibited at numerous museums in the US including the Museum of Contemporary Art Jacksonville, the Erie Art Museum and the Mobile Museum of Art. Abroad, his work has been exhibited at the Stedelijk Museum – 's-Hertogenbosch, the Kunsthalle der Hypo-Kulturstiftung in Munich, the Museum Franz Gertsch in Burgdorf, the Museum Folkwang in Essen, the Gemeentemuseum Helmond, the Scheringa Museum of Realist Art in Spanbroek, the Kunsthal Rotterdam, the Kunsthalle Emden, the Kunsthalle Krems, the Galerie Rudolfinum and the Zentrum Paul Klee in Bern.

Critical response
Terry Rodgers is a realist known for his contemporary character studies. While his earlier paintings often contemplated personal and family relationships in brightly lit outdoor settings wrought with pale, intense, high-keyed colors, his recent paintings conjure up a vision of the private nightlife of America's privileged youth. Widely exhibited in the U.S. and Europe and noted for their subtle social commentary. Rodgers’ complex compositions emphasize the detachment of his characters: the eye can trace the angles and curves of their intersecting bodies on the painting’s surface, but their gazes almost all diverge from each other. They seem to share the disappointment of F. Scott Fitzgerald's hollow glamour seekers and the bourgeois ennui mined by Eric Fischl and David Salle.

Cutting edge art and the figurative is again avant-garde in the paintings by Terry Rodgers. The viewer is at the same time a voyeur and a guest at the party, but an existential calm reigns in the paintings. Rodgers is a master of composition. His strange parties are, despite all their photographic qualities, put together like a painting by Rubens.

There is also a troubled insouciance in his characters despite the appearance of living out a seeming fantasy – the clothes, the looks and lounging in the midst of a quasi-orgy fest – there is something fragile and complex about his characters.

Notes and references

Further reading
George Kinghorn, Skin: Contemporary Views of the Body, Museum of Contemporary Art Jacksonville, 2003. 
Julia Haussmann, zuruck zur figur, malerei der gegenwart (back to the figure, painting of the present), Prestel Verlag Kunstahalle der Hypo-Kulturstiftung and die Autoren, 2006–2007. 
Alina Reyes & Catherine Somzé, —The Apotheosis of Pleasure—Terry Rodgers, TORCH Books, 2006.  | 
Howard Tullman & Paul William Richelson, PhD, Creative Imaginings: The Howard A. and Judith Tullman Collection, The Mobile Museum of Art, 2006. 
Luigi Settembrini, 3rd Bienal de Valencia: Agua sin ti no soy (Water without you I'm not), 2005.  | 
Jim Zimmerman, Vectors of Desire: Terry Rodgers' Vision of the American Millennial Moment, iUniverse/Standing Watch Productions, 2004. 
Dr. Eva Karcher, "Terry Rodgers—Dimensions of Ambiguity", TORCH Books, 2009. 
Margi Geerlinks, Adriaan van der Have, "The Unforgettable Fire 25 Years Torch Gallery", Art Unlimited, 2009. 
Jeannette Dekeukeleire, Harry Ruhe, "Hidden Delights—Lingerie in the Arts", Art Kitchen Galerie, Galerie A. Johannes Verhulststraat, 2009.

External links
Official Terry Rodgers Website
Official Aeroplastics Contemporary Website
Official Torch Gallery Website
Terry Rodgers on Widewalls
Camera Littera on The Apotheosis of Pleasure by Camera Littera
 The Absent by Alina Reyes
Iconique.com Les Arts Digitales feature
Webesteem Art & Design Magazine feature
Blend Magazine video documentary of Terry Rodgers
Die Welt review
Terry Rodgers on tut-art.ru

1947 births
Living people
20th-century American painters
American male painters
21st-century American painters
Artists from Newark, New Jersey
Amherst College alumni
American photographers
20th-century American sculptors
American male sculptors
Sculptors from New Jersey
20th-century American male artists